Dawn of the Croods is an American 2D-animated web television series that is produced by DreamWorks Animation. The series is based on the 2013 animated film The Croods, taking place before the events of the film. It premiered on December 24, 2015, on Netflix. Sam Riegel voice directs this series. Season 2 premiered on August 26, 2016. Season 3 premiered on April 7, 2017. Season 4 premiered on July 7, 2017.

The adventures of the series takes place before the film, with Eep having new friends, and the rest of the Croods facing new enemy creatures, such as bearowls. 52 episodes of Dawn of the Croods have been released, concluding the series.

Series overview

Episodes

Season 1 (2015)

Season 2 (2016)

Season 3 (2017)

Season 4 (2017)

References

Dawn of the Croods